James Scott Cumberland Reid, Baron Reid,  (30 July 1890 – 29 March 1975) was a Scottish Unionist politician and judge.  His reputation is as one of the most outstanding judges of the 20th century.

Life

He was born on 30 July 1890 in Drem, East Lothian the son of James Reid a Solicitor of the Supreme Courts (SSC) and his wife, Kate Scott.

Educated at Edinburgh Academy, he then studied law at Jesus College, Cambridge, graduating BA in 1910 and LLB in 1911. He was admitted as an advocate in 1914.

He was commissioned into the 8th battalion Royal Scots in World War I and was seconded to the Machine Gun Corps in 1916, serving in Mesopotamia and reaching the rank of Major. He resigned his commission in 1921. He was appointed a King's Counsel in 1932.

He was Member of Parliament (MP) for Stirling and Falkirk from October 1931 until his defeat in November 1935, and for Glasgow Hillhead from June 1937 until September 1948.

He served as Solicitor General for Scotland from June 1936 until June 1941, and as Lord Advocate from June 1941 until July 1945, and was appointed a Privy Counsellor in 1941.

From 1945 to 1948 he was Dean of the Faculty of Advocates. In 1948 he was appointed as a Lord of Appeal in Ordinary and received a Law Life Peerage as Baron Reid, of Drem in East Lothian. He sat as a Lord of Appeal in Ordinary until 1975.  He was one of very few people to be appointed a Law Lord straight from the Bar, without any intervening judicial experience.

Reid was appointed a Companion of Honour in 1967.

He died in London on 29 March 1975.

Family

In 1933 he married Mrs Esther Mary Brierley (née Nelson), a widow.

They did not have any children.

Cases decided
Bonnington Castings Ltd v Wardlaw [1956] AC 613, [1956] 2 WLR 707, [1956] 1 All ER 615
Overseas Tankship (UK) Ltd v Morts Dock and Engineering Co Ltd aka (Wagon Mound (No. 1)) [1961] 1 All ER 404
Scruttons Ltd v Midland Silicones Ltd [1962] AC 446
 Shaw v DPP [1962] AC 220
 Ridge v Baldwin, [1964] AC 40
 Rookes v. Barnard [1964] AC 1129
Beswick v Beswick [1968] AC 58
Madzimbamuto v Lardner-Burke, [1969] 1 AC 645
Dorset Yacht Co Ltd v Home Office [1970] AC 1004
McGhee v National Coal Board [1972] 3 All ER 1008
 Knuller v. DPP  [1973] A.C. 435
Norwich Pharmacal Co. v Customs and Excise Commissioners [1974] AC 133

Selected judgments
In Shaw v DPP, (1961) UKHL 1 rendered on 4 May 1961, Reid said,

In the same case, he went on to say:

References

External links 

UK Parliamentary Archives, The Reid Papers

1890 births
1975 deaths
20th-century Scottish judges
Alumni of Jesus College, Cambridge
British Army personnel of World War I
Deans of the Faculty of Advocates
Fellows of the Royal Society of Edinburgh
Hillhead
Law lords
Lord Advocates
Reid, James Scott Cumberland
Members of the Judicial Committee of the Privy Council
Members of the Order of the Companions of Honour
Members of the Parliament of the United Kingdom for Glasgow constituencies
Members of the Parliament of the United Kingdom for Stirling constituencies
Members of the Privy Council of the United Kingdom
Ministers in the Churchill wartime government, 1940–1945
People educated at Edinburgh Academy
People from East Lothian
Politics of Falkirk (council area)
20th-century King's Counsel
Royal Scots officers
Senior Lords of Appeal in Ordinary
Solicitors General for Scotland
UK MPs 1931–1935
UK MPs 1935–1945
UK MPs 1945–1950
UK MPs who were granted peerages
Unionist Party (Scotland) MPs
Ministers in the Churchill caretaker government, 1945
Ministers in the Chamberlain wartime government, 1939–1940
Ministers in the Chamberlain peacetime government, 1937–1939
Life peers created by George VI